Take a Look at Those Cakes is the 47th studio album by American musician James Brown. The album was released in December 1978, by Polydor Records. It was arranged by Brown and St. Clair Pinckney. The cover artwork was credited to Christoph Blumrich.

Track listing

References

1978 albums
James Brown albums
Albums produced by James Brown
Polydor Records albums